Baron Charles-Ferdinand N. M. P. Nothomb (born 3 May 1936) is a French-speaking Belgian politician.

He is a member of the Humanist Democratic Centre (cdH). He served as Belgian Minister of Foreign Affairs from 1980 until 1981, and as Minister of the Interior from 1981 to 1986. Since 2002 Nothomb has been Vice President of the European Movement international.

Charles-Ferdinand Nothomb is the great-uncle of the Belgian writer Amélie Nothomb.

Honours 
He has been awarded the following decorations:

National honours 
  :
 1995 : Minister of State, By Royal Decree of HM King Albert II.
 1995 : Grand Cross of the Order of the Crown.
 1991 : Grand Cross of the Order of Leopold II
 1987 : Grand Officer of the Order of Leopold
 1985 : Civic Medal, 1st Class

Foreign honours 
  : Grand Officier of the Legion of honour (20 February 1984)
  : Grand Cross of the National Order of Merit (Gabon) (14 January 1982)
  : Grand Cross of the Order of Honour (3 April 1982)
  : Knights Grand Cross of the Order of the Falcon (16 October 1979) 
  : Knight Grand Cross of the Order of Merit of the Italian Republic
  : Grand Cross of the Order of the Aztec Eagle
  : Knight Grand Cross of the Order of Orange-Nassau (1980)
  : Grand Cross of the Order of Merit of the Republic of Poland (24 September 1979)

References

External links
 
 Official site (French only)
 Charles-Ferdinand Nothomb in ODIS - Online Database for Intermediary Structures

|-

|-

|-

1936 births
Belgian Ministers of State
Centre démocrate humaniste MEPs
Centre démocrate humaniste politicians
Foreign ministers of Belgium
Living people
Politicians from Brussels
Presidents of the Chamber of Representatives (Belgium)

Grand Crosses of the Order of the Crown (Belgium)
Recipients of the Grand Cross of the Order of Leopold II

Grand Officiers of the Légion d'honneur
Grand Crosses of the Order of Honour (Greece) 

Knights Grand Cross of the Order of Orange-Nassau
Knights Grand Cross of the Order of the Falcon
Grand Crosses of the Order of Merit of the Republic of Poland
Knights Grand Cross of the Order of Merit of the Italian Republic